A. N. Other is used as a placeholder name or, less commonly, a pseudonym used by a person wishing to remain anonymous. It is most used in the United Kingdom, often written as AN Other. Occasionally it may be abbreviated to ANO, or—in cases where a female name is expected—rendered as Ann(e) Other.

As a placeholder name, A. N. Other is commonly employed in lists of cricket players, where players' names are traditionally listed as initials and surname (e.g., I. T. Botham), for players whose names have not yet been announced or are unknown (e.g. "Additional players: A. W. Smith, J. C. Taylor and A. N. Other").

The Formula One racing driver Jackie Stewart raced as "A. N. Other" early in his career, supposedly because his mother would worry if she knew he was racing cars.

Less frequently used is U. N. Owen, as for example used in the Agatha Christie novel And Then There Were None.

The name is also used for demonstration on sample documents and identity cards.

An equivalent term is "NN", for "Nomen nescio". Of equivalent function are TBA, TBC, and TBD (to be announced, confirmed, determined).

See also
List of pseudonyms
John Doe

References

External links
Johnson carves some turkey - Cricinfo article using "AN Other", 16 September 2006.

Anonymity pseudonyms
Placeholder names